Spider Webb may refer to:

Graham Webb (broadcaster), Graham "Spider" Webb, an Australian radio and TV broadcaster and producer
Travis Webb, Travis "Spider" Webb, American racecar driver
Spider Webb (jazz drummer), American jazz drummer and session musician
Spider Webb (tattoo artist) (1944–2022), American tattoo artist
Ellsworth Webb (1931-2017), American professional boxer, nicknamed "Spider"
Rhys Webb (organist / bassist), bassist for English band The Horrors 
The drummer of the fictional band Bad News
"Spider" (Aloysius) Webb, main character of a series of science fiction books by K. A. Bedford

See also
Spider Web (disambiguation)